School City of Hobart is a school district headquartered in Hobart, Indiana. The district serves most of the city of Hobart.

Schools
All schools are in Hobart.

 Hobart High School (9-12)
 Hobart Middle School (6-8)
 George Earle Early Learning Center (PK-K)
 Veteran's Elementary School at Mundell (1-5)
 Liberty Elementary School (1-5)
 Joan Martin Elementary School (1-5)

References

External links
 

Hobart
Hobart
1913 establishments in Indiana